Adolf Freiherr Spies von Büllesheim (June 4, 1929 – February 12, 2011) was a German politician, farmer and lawyer.

Life 

Adolf Spies von Büllesheim was born in Haus Hall in Ratheim, district of Heinsberg, in North Rhine-Westphalia, property of the baronial Spies von Büllesheim family since the 18th century. He was the son of Egon Franz Freiherr Spies von Büllesheim and his wife Maria (born Freiin von Oer). 

After school in Erkelenz he studied German law and farming at universities in Cologne and in Bonn. After university he worked as a farmer and a lawyer from 1960 to 1997. 

Since 1952 Spies von Büllesheim was a member of the CDU political party. From 1969 to 1972 he was mayor of Hückelhoven. From 1972 to 1987 Spies von Büllesheim was member of the German Bundestag for Heinsberg.

He died in 2011 in Neuhall, Ratheim.

Personal life
Spies von Büllesheim was married to Gräfin Maria Immaculata (born Concha) von Mirbach-Harff, Freiin von Vittinghoff (1938–2002), and together they had six children.

Awards 
 1979: Order of Merit of the Federal Republic of Germany

Notes and references

Further reading
 Rudolf Vierhaus, Ludolf Herbst (eds.), Bruno Jahn (coll.): Biographisches Handbuch der Mitglieder des Deutschen Bundestages. 1949–2002. Bd. 2: N–Z. Anhang. K. G. Saur, München 2002, pp. 829–830
 Frank Körfer: "Adolf Spies von Büllesheim (1929–2011) und die Familie Spieß von Büllesheim zu Hall". In: Kreis Heinsberg (publ.): Heimatkalender des Kreises Heinsberg

External links 

 trauer-rp-online.de (Rheinische Post, 17 February 2011)
 Aachen-gedenkt.de: 17 February 2011
 Bundesarchiv.de: Adolf Freiherr Spies von Büllesheim

1929 births
2011 deaths
People from North Rhine-Westphalia
German farmers
German lawyers
Members of the Bundestag 1972–1976
Members of the Bundestag 1976–1980
Members of the Bundestag 1980–1983
Members of the Bundestag 1983–1987
Members of the Bundestag for North Rhine-Westphalia
Members of the Bundestag for the Christian Democratic Union of Germany
Recipients of the Order of Merit of the Federal Republic of Germany